Marcelo Demoliner and João Souza were the defending champions, but decided to compete São Paulo instead.

Christian Garin and Nicolás Jarry won the title when Jorge Aguilar and Hans Podlipnik-Castillo withdrew.

Seeds

  José Hernández /  Eduardo Schwank (semifinals)
  Hugo Dellien /  Renzo Olivo (semifinals)
  Jorge Aguilar /  Hans Podlipnik-Castillo (final, withdrew)
  Guido Andreozzi /  Andrea Collarini (quarterfinals)

Draw

Draw

References
Main Draw

Challenger ATP Cachantun Cup - Singles
2014 - Doubles